The Battles of Farsia and Oum Dreyga occurred on 18 November 1987 in Farsia and Oum Dreyga, on the Moroccan side of the Moroccan Western Sahara Wall, when POLISARIO troops clashed with the Royal Moroccan Army. Over 300 combatants died as a result of the two battles. The clashes happened two days after the arrival of a United Nations technical mission whose goal was to evaluate the conditions for a self-determination referendum in Western Sahara.

References

Farsia and Oum Dreyga (1987)
Western Sahara conflict
1987 in Western Sahara
Conflicts in 1987
November 1987 events in Africa